Lithium iodide, or LiI, is a compound of lithium and iodine. When exposed to air, it becomes yellow in color, due to the oxidation of iodide to iodine. It crystallizes in the NaCl motif. It can participate in various hydrates.

Applications

Lithium iodide is used as a solid-state electrolyte for high-temperature batteries. It is also the standard electrolyte in artificial pacemakers due to the long cycle life it enables. The solid is used as a phosphor for neutron detection. It is also used, in a complex with Iodine, in the electrolyte of dye-sensitized solar cells.

In organic synthesis, LiI is useful for cleaving C-O bonds. For example, it can be used to convert methyl esters to carboxylic acids:
RCO2CH3 + LiI → RCO2Li + CH3I
Similar reactions apply to epoxides and aziridines.

Lithium iodide was used as a radiocontrast agent for CT scans. Its use was discontinued due to renal toxicity. Inorganic iodine solutions suffered from hyperosmolarity and high viscosities. Current iodinated contrast agents are organoiodine compounds.

See also
Lithium battery

References

External links

Lithium compounds
Iodides
Alkali metal iodides
Deliquescent substances
Metal halides
Rock salt crystal structure